Nigg (from the  meaning "the notch", referring to a feature of the hills above the parish church) is a village and parish in Easter Ross, administered by the Highland Council. It lies on the north shore of the entrance to the Cromarty Firth.

Nigg Old Church 
The present parish church is an 18th-century building on an early Christian site dating back to at least the 8th century.  The Nigg Stone, one of the most elaborate stone monuments of early medieval western Europe, is preserved in a room at the west end of the church.  This late 8th century Pictish cross-slab formerly stood in the churchyard, but was moved indoors for preservation in recent years.

The nearby manse is one of the oldest to survive in Scotland, dating back to the first half of the 17th century.  It is now privately owned and no longer used as the parish minister's residence.

Nigg Old has its odd and curious features. In the churchyard is the Cholera Stone, dating from the cholera epidemic of 1832. One of the elders, on coming out of the church, saw a cloud of vapour hovering above the ground. He believed it to be a cloud of cholera, threw a blanket or cloth over it and placed this large stone on top to keep it from escaping. And inside the church, according to one tradition, the beadle  (church officer) allowed an illicit still to be kept in the space under the pulpit.

Marine fabrication yard 
Nigg was the site of a crude oil storage and processing depot for oil piped in from the now abandoned Beatrice oil field in the Moray Firth and of a major multi user energy park including a dry dock operated by Global Energy Group.

In the oil boom of the 1970s, the oil fabrication yard at Nigg was extremely busy with many of the skilled workers moving up from areas such as Glasgow.  This resulted in what was called "Glasgow colonies" in towns such as Invergordon and Alness, with many of the families choosing to make the move permanent.  This can be seen as even now with some of residents still possessing a Glaswegian accent.

Since the purchase of the fabrication yard by Global Energy Group in 2011 and with investment from the Scottish Government the area has begun to see a new influx of workers to the area again with the yard having plenty of work in the renewable energy sector and also in oil drilling rig refurbishment. In 2012 Global Energy Group set up a skills academy to create new jobs for local residents and young people and this has resulted in a fall in unemployment in the area and a welcome boost to the local economy. In March 2017, Global Energy submitted an application to the Scottish Government requesting the yard be made a private port.

The order which was eventually granted, created Nigg Port and gave Global and Nigg Energy Park increased management powers over the quays, wharfs, enclosed dry dock and adjoining land area at Nigg, the ability to maintain and improve the facility through development rights powers, set reasonable charges for facility users, control goods and hazardous substances and manage the security of the port area. It also gives them the right to board vessels moored alongside the port facility or remove vessels, goods and vehicles within Nigg Port's boundaries.

In 2021, SSE approved a £110m investment in a wind turbine tower factory at the Port of Nigg.

Ferry service 
The Nigg to Cromarty ferry route is often called The King’s Ferry – the route taken by King James IV of Scotland when on pilgrimage to the shrine of St Duthac at Tain, doing so at least 18 times in the years between 1493 to 1513.

It is the only ferry service from the Black Isle.  The ferry crosses the entrance to the Cromarty Firth, one of the finest natural harbours in Europe and also an area rich in wildlife and world-famous for its dolphin population.

There was no ferry service during 2015.

The former Nigg Ferry Hotel, now a private residence, is near to the ferry pier (at ).

Notable persons
James Munro, recipient of the Victoria Cross
William Brydon famous for reportedly being the only member of the British expedition retreat from Kabul in 1842 to reach safety

Further reading
 Interview with Tommy Lafferty, Convenor of the Joint Shop Stewards Committee at the Highland Fabricators yard at Nigg, in Burnett, Ray (ed.), Calgacus 1, Winter 1975, pp. 20 – 22,

See also
Nigg Bay
Nigg Stone

References

External links 
 Cromarty Ferry
 Nigg Energy Park
 Nigg Old Church

Populated places in Ross and Cromarty
Parishes in Ross and Cromarty
Enterprise areas of Scotland